Radchenko (Ukrainian and Russian; Ра́дченко) may refer to:

People
Aleksandr Nikolayevich Radchenko (b. 1993), Russian association football player
Alexander Radchenko, Transnistrian activist and politician
Andrew Radchenko (b. 1955), Australian rules footballer
Andriy Radchenko (b. 1972), Ukrainian banker, manager of agrarian sector
Artem Radchenko (b. 1995), Ukrainian association football player
Dmitri Radchenko (b. 1970), Russian association football player
Ludmilla Radchenko (b. 1978), Russian female model
Nikolai Radchenko (b. 1995), Russian football player
Oleksandr Radchenko (1976–2023), Ukrainian association football player
Olena Radchenko (b. 1973), Ukrainian female handball player
Viktor Radchenko (b. 1968), Ukrainian decathlete
Volodymyr Radchenko (1948–2023), Ukrainian  politician and General of Army of Ukraine

Places
Radchenko (urban-type settlement), an urban-type settlement in Tver Oblast, Russia
Radchenko (platform), a railway platform in Leningrad Oblast, Russia

See also
 

Ukrainian-language surnames
Surnames of Ukrainian origin